Avner Yashar  (born June 13, 1956) is an Israeli architect and the owner of Yashar Architects.

Biography

Family and studies 
Avner was born in Tel Aviv in 1956. His mother was Rema Samsonov, an opera singer, a professor at the Beit Zvi School for the Performing Arts and Honorary Citizen of Tel Aviv, and his father was the architect Yitzhak Yashar, winner of the Rokach Prize and Rechter Prize, who designed many buildings in Israel such as the "Tel Aviv Museum of Art", "Mexico Building" at Tel Aviv University, "David Towers" and "Dizengoff Center."

In the late 1970s, Avner began studying psychology and philosophy at Tel Aviv University. Prior to graduating, Avner chose to change his field of study and in 1980 he commenced his studies in architecture at the Bezalel Academy of Arts and Design in Jerusalem. After four years, he furthered his studies at the Technion – Israel Institute of Technology in Haifa, where he graduated in 1986. During his years of study, Avner had already begun working with his father in his office.

As an architect 
Since 1997, Yashar has been the chief architect and owner of Yashar Architects. The firm currently employs 87 workers, including 76 Architects and 5 partners .

In 2002, the plan for the Tzamarot Ayalon neighborhood in Tel Aviv, which was designed by Avner Yashar's office, was approved. In this neighborhood Avner also designed four high-rise buildings:

One Tower, W-Tower, W Prime and ROM Tower, the tallest in the neighborhood.

In 2009 Avner won a competition for the design of the Metropolitan Development Authority building in Hyderabad city, India after defeating 10 firms (Indian and international). Of the four firms which reached the finals of the competition, Yashar's project was selected.

In 2011, Avner became the first Israeli Architect to win an Award of Excellence in the CTBUH (Council on Tall Buildings and Urban Habitat ) International Competition for Skyscrapers with two high –rise towers that were designed by him

In 2017, after planning joint projects such as Totzeret HaAretz Towers (TOHA) in Tel Aviv and Bay 51 in Haifa, Avner established a joint firm with Israeli-Londoner Architect and designer Ron Arad, named AradYashar

In 2021, the ToHA building, designed by Ron Arad and Avner Yashar, won the CTBUH award for "Best Tall Office Building," and "Best Tall Building Middle East and Africa". 

In 2018, Avner's firm won two first prize awards at an excellence Competition of the Israeli Construction and Infrastructure Industry. Tel Aviv's "Bezalel Market" project won the "Luxury Residential Complex" category, and Herzliya's "Vitania House - Fedco" project won the "Best Office Building" category.

Architectural Ideology 
For the past 20 years, Avner has been calling for the densification of cities in Israel. During these years, the projects he planned were also characterized by multiple urban construction, including the construction of skyscrapers and mixed-use projects. In addition, Avner claims that the accelerated population growth requires new and innovative thinking regarding the development of future cities in Israel. In terms of his architectural ideology, Avner has been defined as a prominent influencing figure in the landscape of high-rise towers of Tel Aviv.

In 2014, Avner taught at the Tel Aviv University's School of Architecture. In the same year, Avner published a study examining the urban connectivity of Tel Aviv. As a part of the study's conclusion, Avner proposed to create main arteries throughout the city which would bear a single name in addition to building more bridges over the Ayalon highway which would further connect the separated eastern and western sections of the city..

As part of Avner's architectural ideology of urban mixed-use development, he designed: Rothschild 1 Tower, Da Vinci Towers, and Sumile Towers in Tel Aviv, W Tower, W Prime and ROM in the Tzameret Park neighborhood, as well as the Diamond Exchange District Towers in the city of Ramat Gan, which will be the largest office complex in Israel and will include a 77, 88 and 120 story Towers. The 120 story tower, which will rise half a kilometer, will be the tallest skyscraper in Israel, and amongst the tallest in the world. In addition, Avner designed a large number of residential and mixed-use complexes, including: The Wholesale Market complex (Gindi TLV) which is the largest residential complex in Tel Aviv, Bezalel Market complex  and the Aliya Market complex (Florentine Village) in Tel Aviv. Yashar also developed a mixed-use master plan for the Yoseftal Intersection area in Holon  and a large residential plan at the corner of Dafna and Arlozorov streets in Tel Aviv.

In 2017, a lecture that was given by Avner at the Bezalel Academy of Arts and Design: "Residential towers as a way out of a crisis" was included in the book "Dreaming of a home - The ongoing housing crisis and high-rise construction in Israel" edited by Joshua Guttman and published by Resling Publishers.

Personal life 
In 1983, Avner married Michal Bahir and they have three children: Tut, Tara and Thai. They divorced in 1998.

In 2010, Avner married Ronit Elkabetz, actress and director, and in 2012 she gave birth to Shalimar and Omri. .  In 2016, Avner Yashar was widowed after Ronit's long battle with lung cancer.

In 2020, Avner married Architect Adi Iny Yashar. In 2021 she gave birth to Raphael Aharon. The couple lives in Tel Aviv.

Avner has lived in Tel Aviv all his life.

Social activity and community contribution. 
In 2013, after his father passed away, Avner initiated the "Yashar Workshop" and the "Yashar Prize", in collaboration with the Tel Aviv University School of Architecture. The "Yashar Prize" is a prize money awarded to an Architecture graduate student who has excelled in his/her degree project.

In 2017, after the death of his wife Ronit Elkabetz, Avner partnered with Ronit's brother Shlomi Elkabetz to initiate a Scholarship in Ronit's name, named "Fearless." This scholarship, which is also supported by the "Sapir Academic College" as well as several Film organizations, provides financial funding to daring and creative artists in the film-making field.

In 2019 the construction of the Oranit Cancer Patient Guest Home in Petah Tikva was completed. The center, which was founded by the Bracha and Motti Zisser Foundation, was designed by Avner. The building's construction, which stretched for a decade, was supervised, completely voluntarily, by Yashar Architects.

List of buildings designed by Avner Yashar.

References

External links 
 A Tv episode about Avner Yashar (Hebrew)

1956 births
Living people
Israeli architects